Thomas Ford (born 3 October 1992) is a British rower.

Rowing career
Ford won a bronze medal at the 2018 World Rowing Championships in Plovdiv, Bulgaria, as part of the coxless four with Jacob Dawson, Adam Neill and James Johnston.
He won a silver medal in the eight at the 2019 European Rowing Championships. He won a bronze medal at the 2019 World Rowing Championships in Ottensheim, Austria as part of the eight with Thomas George, James Rudkin, Josh Bugajski, Moe Sbihi, Jacob Dawson, Oliver Wynne-Griffith, Matthew Tarrant and Henry Fieldman.

In 2021, he won a European gold medal in the eight in Varese, Italy.

References

External links

Thomas Ford at British Rowing

Living people
1992 births
British male rowers
World Rowing Championships medalists for Great Britain
Rowers at the 2020 Summer Olympics
Medalists at the 2020 Summer Olympics
Olympic medalists in rowing
Olympic bronze medallists for Great Britain
21st-century British people